Berlin Pichelsberg is a railway station in the Westend district of Berlin.

References

Pichelsberg
Pichelsberg
Railway stations in Germany opened in 1911